Tucker syndrome, also known as Ptosis-vocal cord paralysis syndrome, is a very rare genetic disorder which is characterized by congenital bilateral ptosis and (also congenital and bilateral) recurrent laryngeal nerve paresis. Additional findings include short stature. It was described in a small 2-generation family (a man and his daughter).

References 

Genetic diseases and disorders